Casabianca is a town and municipality in the Tolima Department of Colombia.  The population of the municipality was 6,501 as of the 1993 census.

Municipalities of Tolima Department